Cabinet or The Cabinet may refer to:

Furniture 
 Cabinetry, a box-shaped piece of furniture with doors and/or drawers
 Display cabinet, a piece of furniture with one or more transparent glass sheets or transparent polycarbonate sheets
 Filing cabinet, a piece of office furniture used to file folders
 Arcade cabinet, a type of furniture which houses arcade games

Government 
 Cabinet (government), a council of high-ranking members of government
 Cabinet, term used for government entities that report directly to the governor's office in the state of Kentucky, US 
 England local government executive arrangements: "leader and cabinet" and "mayor and cabinet" models
 War cabinet, typically set up in wartime

Equipment 
 Loudspeaker enclosure
 Computer case
 A slotted screwdriver blade type
 Serving area interface or telecoms cabinet

Media 
 The Cabinet (TV series), an Australian political program
 Cabinet (file format), a computer compressed file extension
 Cabinet (magazine), on art and culture
 Cabinet (album), by Spawn of Possession
 Milford Cabinet, a New Hampshire newspaper
 "Cabinet", a song by Spratleys Japs from Pony

Other 
 Cabinet (cigarette), a German brand of cigarettes
 Cabinet (room), an early private room
 Cabinet Room (White House)
 The Cabinet (professional wrestling) faction

See also 
 
 Cabinet card
 Cabinet Inlet
 Cabinet of curiosities
 Cabinet painting
 Cabinet projection
 Cabinet selection
 Coffee cabinet
 List of national governments